Arkady (Avraam) Il'ich Ostrovsky (also spelled Ostrovskij, Ostrovskyj ) (February 25 [O.S. February 12], 1914 – September 18, 1967) was a Soviet Russian composer of light music, the author of the song May There Always Be Sunshine and other Soviet songs of the 1960s, including the lullaby of Good Night, Little Ones, the children's TV program aired for nearly 60 years, most famous rendition sung by Oleg Anofriyev.

Life

Ostrovsky was born to a Jewish family in Syzran. From 1927 on, he lived in Leningrad. He worked in Leonid Utyosov's Jazz Orchestra from 1940 to 1947 and composed his first works.

He died in Sochi in 1967. In 2004, Ostrovsky got a star posthumously on the Star Square in Moscow.

Internet meme

In 2009, a 1976 video of singer Eduard Khil singing Ostrovsky's vocalise I am very glad, because I’m finally going home (Я очень рад, ведь я, наконец, возвращаюсь домой) was uploaded to YouTube and quickly became an Internet meme known as "Trololololololololololo." The song itself was written by Ostrovsky, and was also performed by Valery Obodzinsky and by Muslim Magomayev on Little Blue Light.

Ostrovsky's son, Mikhail, is quoted as saying:

Hootenanny Singers
Ostrovsky is the author of dozens of popular songs in the post-Soviet countries.
For example he is author of music for the song "Let there always be sunshine", which was "taken" under the name of 'Gabriel' into repertoire of the swedish band 'Hootenanny Singer' without specifying the author.

In Russian
https://www.youtube.com/watch?v=WFhphQcHpUY

In English
https://www.youtube.com/watch?v=OKskFdD-0Fk

External links
memorial site (with music samples)

1914 births
1967 deaths
People from Syzran
People from Syzransky Uyezd
Russian Jews
Russian composers
Russian male composers
Soviet composers
Soviet male composers
20th-century classical musicians
20th-century composers
20th-century Russian male musicians